Stokłosa or Stoklosa is a Polish surname meaning brome grass. Notable people with the name include:

 Aleksandra Stokłosa (born 1999), Polish handball player
 Henryk Stokłosa (born 1949), Polish businessman and political activist
 Janusz Stokłosa (born 1954), Polish pianist and composer

See also
 
 Stoklosa Alumni Field, a baseball field in Lowell, Massachusetts, United States
 Stoklasa, a surname

References

Polish-language surnames